(from  - troika, “team of three”) is a Japanese animation studio founded by former AIC producer Toshiyuki Nagano, photography director Tomonori Katou, and anime director Ei Aoki in May 2013.

Works

Television series

OVAs/ONAs

Notes

References

External links
  
 

 
Animation studios in Tokyo
Japanese companies established in 2013
Japanese animation studios
Nerima
Mass media companies established in 2013